Karen Maree Brown (born 9 September 1963) is an Australian former cricketer who played as a right-arm medium bowler and right-handed batter. She appeared in 9 Test matches and 43 One Day Internationals for Australia between 1985 and 1993. She captained Australia in one ODI in 1991. She played domestic cricket for Victoria.

References

External links
 
 
 Karen Brown at southernstars.org.au

1963 births
Living people
Cricketers from Melbourne
Australia women Test cricketers
Australia women One Day International cricketers
Victoria women cricketers